In geometry, a hypotenuse is the longest side of a right-angled triangle, the side opposite the right angle. The length of the hypotenuse can be found using the Pythagorean theorem, which states that the square of the length of the hypotenuse equals the sum of the squares of the lengths of the other two sides. For example, if one of the other sides has a length of 3 (when squared, 9) and the other has a length of 4 (when squared, 16), then their squares add up to 25. The length of the hypotenuse is the square root of 25, that is, 5.

Etymology

The word hypotenuse is derived from Greek  (sc.  or ), meaning "[side] subtending the right angle" (Apollodorus),  hupoteinousa being the feminine present active participle of the verb  hupo-teinō "to stretch below, to subtend", from  teinō "to stretch, extend". The nominalised participle,  was used for the hypotenuse of a triangle in the 4th century BCE (attested in Plato, Timaeus 54d). The Greek term was loaned into Late Latin, as hypotēnūsa. The spelling in -e, as hypotenuse, is French in origin (Estienne de La Roche 1520).

Calculating the hypotenuse

The length of the hypotenuse can be calculated using the square root function implied by the Pythagorean theorem. Using the common notation that the length of the two legs of the triangle (the sides perpendicular to each other) are a and b and that of the hypotenuse is c, we have

The Pythagorean theorem, and hence this length, can also be derived from the law of cosines by observing that the angle opposite the hypotenuse is 90° and noting that its cosine is 0:

Many computer languages support the ISO C standard function hypot(x,y), which returns the value above. The function is designed not to fail where the straightforward calculation might overflow or underflow and can be slightly more accurate and sometimes significantly slower.

Some scientific calculators provide a function to convert from rectangular coordinates to polar coordinates. This gives both the length of the hypotenuse and the angle the hypotenuse makes with the base line (c1 above) at the same time when given x and y. The angle returned is normally given by atan2(y,x).

Trigonometric ratios 

Given the length of the hypotenuse and of a cathetus , the ratio is:

The trigonometric inverse function is:

The adjacent angle of the catheti  is  = 90° – 

One may also obtain the value of the angle by the equation:

See also

Cathetus
Triangle
Space diagonal
Nonhypotenuse number
Taxicab geometry
Trigonometry
Special right triangles
Pythagoras

Notes

References 
 Hypotenuse at Encyclopaedia of Mathematics
 

Parts of a triangle
Trigonometry
Pythagorean theorem